American Intellectuals is a (1999) satire film written and directed by Paige Taylor, starring Peter Hansen Gibson, Shawnee Free Jones, Portia de Rossi and Alex Martin.

Plot Outline

Seven WASP, blonde, privileged teens reside in the exclusive Hamptons, New York. Their group and entire existence consists of PLUs (People Like Us).

Cast
Peter Hansen Gibson as Parker
Shawnee Free Jones as Jennifer
Alex Martin as Hugh
Portia de Rossi as Sarah
Alison Dean as Beatrice
Anne Kelly as Sissy
Andrew Lauren as Ashtentino
Jan Schweiterman as Cooper
Rod Biermann as James
Michael Green as Timothy Leary
Michael Sutton as Deckhand

External links

1999 films
American satirical films
1999 comedy films
1990s American films